The Devils Lake Daily Journal is an American English language daily newspaper printed in Devils Lake, North Dakota. It is owned by Champion Media.  The Journal is the official newspaper of Ramsey County, North Dakota, and has a modest circulation in northeast North Dakota. The paper also covers local school sports and items of news for Bensen and Nelson Counties, expanding their coverage zones in recent years, while also being the local coverage source for the Spirit Lake Indian Reservation.

Devils Lake Daily Journal publishes in print three times a week on Tuesdays, Thursdays and Fridays. It has a digital presentation, publishing news on their website seven days a week with a digital viewership reaching over 200,000 viewers. In 2021, the paper redesigned the look of the paper after several decades of following a previous format. The three day printed one section paper usually consists of local and state news pages, an opinion page, a faith page and a sports page. The paper also publishes a weekly shopper known as "The Country Peddler" and periodical special multi section editions.

In September 2021, after more than 100 years, the Journal closed its printing room and transferred all printing to Bismarck, North Dakota. While printing transferred to Bismarck, the local office in Devils Lake remains open, housing the editorial and sales staff. In November 2022, Devils Lake Journal was sold to Champion Media.

Leadership

Devils Lake Daily Journal is owned and managed by Champion Media.

Building

The Devils Lake Journal is housed in the historic downtown area of Devils Lake, close to the county courthouse. The building, which housed a former telephone company, has served as the main offices for the paper for over 30 years. Devils Lake Journal's original location was three blocks east of the current location.

References

External links
Devils Lake Journal website

Newspapers published in North Dakota
Ramsey County, North Dakota
Publications established in 1906
1906 establishments in North Dakota